Marc Harshman (born ) is a Poet Laureate for the state of West Virginia. He was appointed as West Virginia's Poet Laureate on May 18, 2012 by former governor Earl Ray Tomblin. Harshman is well-known for his numerous children’s books and works in public poetry.

Biography 
Marc Harshman was born and raised in Randolph County, Indiana. Growing up in a very rural area of Indiana, books allowed Harshman to imagine being in other places across the world. He attended Bethany College, graduating in 1973. Harshman then went on to earn a Master of Arts in Religion from Yale Divinity School in 1975 and a Master of Arts from the University of Pittsburgh in 1978. Later on, Harshman received additional honorary doctorates from his alma mater, Bethany College, and West Liberty University for the recognition of his life's work.

In between earning his degrees, Harshman married his wife and fellow writer, Cheryl Ryan, in August 1976. They have one child, Sarah. She is now a children's librarian, following in her parents' footsteps. Now Marc and his wife Cheryl live in Moundsville, West Virginia. 
Harshman's promising career of many publications has led to him being named as the West Virginia State Poet Laureate in 2012. He accepted this role stating his role is to, “support the life of writers here in West Virginia.” The requirements for being the West Virginia State Poet Laureate is to be a resident of the state and having written and published work of “recognized merit.” The poet laureate must serve at the will of the governor and receive a $2000 stipend every year.

Career 
Marc Harshman began his career as a grade-school teacher and college professor. He taught creative writing at the University of Pittsburgh and West Virginia Northern Community College. He later transitioned to teaching grade school at Sandy Hill Elementary School in Dallas, West Virginia. Harshman continues to return to Sand Hill Elementary School and runs workshops to inspire the students.

Harshman published his first poetry book, Turning Out the Stones in 1983, and his first children’s book, A Little Excitement, in 1989. Marc Harshman has published multiple collections of poetry and received a Smithsonian Award for his children’s book, The Storm (1995). In 2012, after the death of Irene McKinney, West Virginia’s former Poet Laureate, Harshman was appointed as the ninth Poet Laureate of West Virginia. Harshman continues to do workshops and puts on a radio show called "The Poetry Break" which was first aired in January 2016. Marc Harshman’s experience allows him to explore a wide array of themes, which can be seen in his various collections of poetry. Harshman’s work is often a reflection of his upbringing and he has been seen as one of the individuals that are revitalizing poetry in West Virginia.

Publications

Poetry 

Believe What You Can: Poems (Vandalia Press, 2016)
Woman in Red Anorak: Poems (Lynx House Press, 2018)
Green-Silver and Silent: Poems (Bottom Dog Press, 2012)
Local Journeys (Finishing Line Press, 2005)
A Song for West Virginia (Quarrier Press, 2014)
All That Feed Us: West Virginia Poems(2013)
Local Journeys(2004)
Rose of Sharon(1999)
Turning out the Stones(1983)

Children's Books 

 The Storm (Scholastic, 1997)
 A Little Excitement (Quarrier Press, 2002)
 Fallingwater: The Building of Frank Lloyd Wright’s Masterpiece
 One Big Family
 Mountain Christmas
 Only One Neighborhood
 Roads
 Red Are the Apples
 All the Way to Morning
 Moving Days
 Uncle James
 Only One
 Rocks in my Pocket
 Snow Company

Awards and Achievements 

 West Virginia State English Teacher in 1995
 “Believe What you Can” was the winner of the 2017 Weatherford Award
 “The Storm” earned many awards…
 Junior Library Guild Selection
 Smithsonian Notable Book for Children
 Children’s Book Council Notable Book for Social Studies
 1995 Parent’s Choice Award Recipient
 Recipient of the WV Arts Commission Fellowship in Poetry in 2000
 Fellowship in Children's Literature in 2008
 Ezra Jack Keats/Kerlan Collection Fellowship from the University of Minnesota for research on Scandinavian myths and folklore

External links
Marc Harshman website
The Making  Of A Poet Laureate - Greenbrier Valley Quarterly
Marc Harshman | e-WV
The West Virginia & Regional History Center at West Virginia University houses the papers of Marc Harshman within the Distinguished West Virginians Archive
Biography of Marc Harshman

Living people
American male poets
Poets from West Virginia
Poets Laureate of West Virginia
1950 births